Two female athletes from Bermuda competed at the 1996 Summer Paralympics in Atlanta, United States.

See also
Bermuda at the Paralympics
Bermuda at the 1996 Summer Olympics

References 

Nations at the 1996 Summer Paralympics
1996
Summer Paralympics